The fourth cabinet of Dimitrie A. Sturdza was the government of Romania from 12 March 1907 to 27 December 1908.

Ministers
The ministers of the cabinet were as follows:

President of the Council of Ministers:
Dimitrie A. Sturdza (12 March 1907 - 27 December 1908)
Minister of the Interior: 
Ion I.C. Brătianu (12 March 1907 - 27 December 1908)
Minister of Foreign Affairs: 
Dimitrie A. Sturdza (12 March 1907 - 27 December 1908)
Minister of Finance:
Emil Costinescu (12 March 1907 - 27 December 1908)
Minister of Justice:
Toma Stelian (12 March 1907 - 27 December 1908)
Minister of Religious Affairs and Public Instruction:
Spiru Haret (12 March 1907 - 27 December 1908)
Minister of War:
Gen. Alexandru Averescu (12 March 1907 - 27 December 1908)
Minister of Public Works:
Vasile G. Morțun (12 March 1907 - 27 December 1908)
Minister of Agriculture, Industry, Commerce, and Property:
Anton Carp (12 March 1907 - 1 April 1907)
Minister of Agriculture and Property:
Anton Carp (1 April 1907 - 27 December 1908)
Minister of Industry and Commerce:
(interim) Anton Carp (1 April 1907 - 2 June 1908)
Alexandru Djuvara (2 June - 27 December 1908)

References

Cabinets of Romania
Cabinets established in 1907
Cabinets disestablished in 1908
1907 establishments in Romania
1908 disestablishments in Romania